The Pipistrel Sinus is a two-seat, single-engine ultralight motor glider, developed and manufactured by Pipistrel in Slovenia and Italy. Its design has served as the base for future Pipistrel developments such as the Virus and Alpha Trainer.

Introduced in 1995, the Sinus has been produced in a number of variants with different engines and undercarriage configurations. It has good STOL characteristics and it can be equipped with a full airframe emergency recovery parachute system.

Development

The development of the Sinus began in November 1994 in close collaboration with the Slovenian firm Albastar Ltd. The wing and fuselage were designed by the Italian aerodynamicist Franco Orlando. In April 1995, the Sinus was unveiled at AERO Friedrichshafen, the main European general aviation trade show. The first flight of the prototype took place on October 16, 1996.

The Sinus has served as the base for the design of future Pipistrel models such as the Virus, which shares the same fuselage and tail, but sports a shorter wing. Both models are usually marketed together as a family of aircraft. The Pipistrel Taurus two-seat motorglider uses the same  wing as the Sinus.

In 2013, Pipistrel started offering the Sinus Flex model, which is a standard Sinus with two interchangeable wingtip sets. The outer section of the wing can be replaced by a shorter part consisting of the winglet of the Virus model, converting the aircraft from motor glider to sport cruiser in minutes. The manufacturer states that the shorter wingtips turn the Sinus into the short-winged, faster-cruising, and easier-to-store Virus model, although there are some slight differences between the two models other than the wings. The Flex wings can be retrofitted to any other Sinus model.

By April 2003, Pipistrel had already produced 100 aircraft of the Sinus/Virus family. This number reached 1000 units by March 2019.

Design
The Sinus is a two-seat, ultra-light, high-wing, cantilever monoplane. It is primarily built from composite materials and is capable of soaring. The variable-pitch propeller (Pipistrel VARIO) can be feathered in order to diminish the air resistance in non-powered flight.

The Pipistrel Sinus comes with either nose-wheel or taildragger landing gear.  Engine models available are the Rotax 503, 582 and 912.

Operational history
In 2001, Philippe Zen and Thomas Knowles flew a Sinus at the World Air Games in Spain and won first place in the two-seat category.

In 2004, Matevž Lenarčič flew a modified Sinus around the world in 79 days, setting several world records.

In May, 2019, Aarohi Pandit became the first woman to fly across the Atlantic Ocean in an ultralight aircraft, in a Sinus 912 named "Mahi." In August, 2019, she also became the first woman to fly across the Pacific Ocean in a light sport aircraft.

Variants

Sinus 447
Rotax 447 powered variant for the Slovenian market.
Sinus 503
Rotax 503 powered variant with a variable-pitch folding propeller.
Sinus 582
As the 503 but fitted with a Rotax 582.
Sinus 912
Rotax 912 powered variant in either UL, LSA or experimental version.
Sinus FLEX
Sinus 912 variant with interchangeable shorter wingtips.

Specifications (Sinus 912)

See also

References

External links

AVweb news publishes an article about Pipistrel
The Popular Science magazine lists Taurus Electro among Ten Best Innovations of 2008
NASA says: Pipistrel Sinus is World's best aircraft

Motor gliders
Pipistrel aircraft
1990s Slovenian sport aircraft
Slovenian ultralight aircraft
T-tail aircraft
Single-engined tractor aircraft
High-wing aircraft
Aircraft first flown in 1995